Alastair John Campbell (born 25 May 1957) is a British journalist, author, strategist, broadcaster and activist known for his roles during Tony Blair's leadership of the Labour Party. Campbell worked as Blair's spokesman and campaign director (1994–1997), then as Downing Street Press Secretary, and as the Prime Minister's Official Spokesperson (1997–2000). He then became Downing Street director of communications and spokesman for the Labour Party (2000–2003). He returned as campaign director for the 2005 United Kingdom general election in Blair's third win.

Campbell is the editor at large of The New European and chief interviewer for GQ. He continues to act as a consultant strategist and as an ambassador for Time to Change and other mental health charities. He was an adviser to the People's Vote campaign, demanding a public vote on the final Brexit deal. Since his work for Blair, Campbell has continued to act as a freelance advisor to a number of governments and political parties, including the Prime Minister of Albania. He published his sixteenth book in 2020. In March 2022, he launched the Rest is Politics podcast with Rory Stewart, which has been the top politics podcast in the UK in the Apple rankings since its launch, and often the leading podcast in the UK.

Early life
Campbell was born on 25 May 1957 in Keighley, West Riding of Yorkshire, son of Scottish veterinary surgeon Donald Campbell and his wife Elizabeth. Campbell's parents had moved to Keighley when his father became a partner in a local veterinary practice. Donald was a Gaelic-speaker from the island of Tiree; his wife was from Ayrshire. Campbell grew up with two older brothers, Donald and Graeme, and a younger sister, Elizabeth.

He attended Bradford Grammar School for a short period of time, followed by City of Leicester Boys' Grammar School and Gonville and Caius College, Cambridge, where he studied modern languages, French and German, for which he received an upper second (2:1). Campbell is an emeritus professor in media at Cambridge University.

In the late 1970s, Campbell spent time teaching in a secondary school in Nice as part of his academic degree course. While hitchhiking back to the city from Aix-en-Provence, he learned of the Belgian singer Jacques Brel's death and shared stories with the Belgian lorry driver who had picked him up, leading to a lifelong interest in Brel's music.

After leaving university Campbell spent some months busking, as well as training as a roulette dealer at the Golden Nugget Casino on Shaftesbury Avenue, before being accepted as a trainee reporter with the Mirror Group Newspapers.

His first published work was Inter-City Ditties, his winning entry to a readers' competition in Forum, the journalistic counterpart to Penthouse magazine. This led to a lengthy stint writing pieces for the magazine with such titles as "Busking with Bagpipes" and "The Riviera Gigolo", written in a style calculated to lead readers at the time to believe they were descriptions of his own sexual exploits.

As part of the Mirror Group training scheme Campbell spent a year at a local weekly paper and he quickly became the sports editor at the Tavistock Times, writing a column called 'Campbell's Corner'. While he was at the Tavistock Times he met his partner Fiona Millar, with whom he has three children; two sons (born November 1987 and July 1989) and a daughter, comedian Grace Campbell (born May 1994). His first significant contribution to news journalism was coverage of the Penlee lifeboat disaster in December 1981, while a trainee on the Plymouth-based Sunday Independent, then owned by Mirror Group Newspapers.

National newspapers
In 1982, Campbell moved to the London office of the Daily Mirror, Fleet Street's sole remaining big-circulation supporter of the Labour Party. He became a political correspondent, then in 1986 moved to Today, a full-colour tabloid newspaper which was at the time trying to turn leftward, where he worked as a news editor.  His rapid rise and its accompanying stress led to alcohol abuse.

Alcoholism and depression
While accompanying Neil Kinnock's tour of Scotland in 1986, he began to display increasingly erratic behaviour, including dumping his hire car in the Rosyth Dockyard. He continued on that day, following Kinnock to Perth, Scotland and finally Hamilton, South Lanarkshire, where he had a nervous breakdown and was arrested by two Special Branch detectives. Police contacted his partner and following her calls to friends in Scotland the police let a family friend take Campbell to Ross Hall Hospital, a private BMI hospital in Glasgow, where she and her father visited him. Over the next five days as an in-patient he was given medication to calm him, and he realised that he had an alcohol problem after seeing a psychiatrist. Campbell said that from that day onwards he counted each day that he did not drink alcohol, and did not stop counting until he had reached thousands.

Campbell returned to England, preferring to stay with friends near Cheltenham rather than return to London (and his partner) where he did not feel safe. His condition continued with a phase of depression, and he was reluctant to seek further medical help. He eventually cooperated with treatment from his family doctor.

Return to work
Campbell's first son was born in 1987. He returned to the Daily Mirror, where he eventually became political editor.

He was a close adviser to Neil Kinnock, going on holiday with the Kinnocks, and worked closely with Mirror publisher Robert Maxwell. Shortly after Maxwell drowned in November 1991, Campbell punched The Guardian journalist Michael White after White joked about "Captain Bob, Bob, Bob...bobbing" in the Atlantic Ocean, referring to where the tycoon's body had been recovered. Campbell later put this down to stress over uncertainty as to whether he and his colleagues would lose their jobs.

After leaving the Mirror in 1993, Campbell became political editor of Today. He was working there when Labour leader John Smith died in 1994. Campbell was a well-known face and helped to interview the three candidates for Labour Party leader; it later became known he had already formed links with Tony Blair.

Politics and government

Shortly after Tony Blair was elected as Leader of the Labour Party in 1994, Campbell left Today to become Blair's press secretary. Having recovered and become teetotaler, he told Blair about his alcoholism, which Blair did not see as a problem. In his autobiography, Blair would later reveal that Campbell had coined the name "New Labour" and described Campbell as a "genius". Campbell wrote the speech that led to the party's review of Clause IV and the birth of "New Labour". In addition to being press spokesman, Campbell was Blair's speechwriter and chief strategist. He oversaw new co-ordination and rebuttal systems which gave birth to a communications machine which became both feared and respected, and the model for modern communications in politics and business. He earned a reputation for ruthless news management which made him many enemies in the media. But even the Conservatives conceded they were partly defeated by their inability to find someone to match him. Campbell played an important role in the run-up to the 1997 UK general election, working with Peter Mandelson to co-ordinate Labour's successful election campaign. He also worked hard to win support from the national media for the Labour Party, particularly from newspapers that for many years had been anti-Labour. By March 1997, many of the leading newspapers—including The Sun, once a staunch Thatcherite paper; had declared their support for Labour.

Campbell moved into government when Labour won the general election in May 1997 and served as the Prime Minister's chief press secretary until 2000. In government, he implemented many radical changes to both procedure and operational management. He persuaded Cabinet Secretary Sir Robin Butler that government communications had to be modernised, and the government set up the Mountfield Review. He created a Strategic Communications Unit which gave Downing Street the power to co-ordinate all government activity, using what became known as "the grid" as its main apparatus. He set up a rapid rebuttal unit similar to the one he had used in opposition. He put Downing Street briefings on record for the first time, and although he was only identified as "The Prime Minister's Official Spokesman", he became one of the most high-profile and written about figures in British politics, earning the epithet "the real deputy Prime Minister". He opened briefings to the foreign media, among a raft of modernisation and efficiency strategies he introduced. In 2001, Campbell claimed that the days of the bog standard comprehensive school were over due to educational policies of the Labour government.

BBC documentary maker Michael Cockerell produced a full-length documentary about Campbell's media operation, News From Number Ten, which Cockerell said attracted more coverage than any of the other films he made. Campbell attacked the news media for their obsession with him, and eventually began to pull back from frontline work and delegated direct briefing of the media to others, but, if anything, his profile continued to grow. He then moved to the post of Prime Minister's Director of Communications, which gave him a strategic role in overseeing government communications.

He was sponsored by US President George W. Bush to complete the London Marathon in aid of leukaemia research charity Bloodwise.

Campbell was part of Tony Blair's core team that conducted the negotiations that led to the Good Friday Agreement in Northern Ireland, and he has been honoured by several Irish universities for his role in the peace process. He became a close friend of, among others, Martin McGuinness, and attended his funeral in 2017. It emerged McGuinness was helping Campbell with a novel which had an IRA active service unit as part of the plot.

He was seconded to overhaul the communications of NATO during the Kosovo crisis, when US President Bill Clinton feared NATO was losing the propaganda war against the Slobodan Milošević regime. The general in charge of the military operation, Wesley Clark, credited Campbell with bringing order and discipline to NATO communications, and freeing the military to do its job.

Campbell became a central figure in the handling of the aftermath of Princess Diana's death after the head of the royal household, the Earl of Airlie, asked Tony Blair to second Campbell to help prepare the funeral, saying they knew it would have to be different. Campbell is widely reported to have coined the phrase "the people's princess" and to have persuaded the queen to make her broadcast to the nation more personal, not least by using the phrase "speaking as a grandmother". Campbell's character appears in the 2006 film The Queen, but he has said most of it was fictional.

He oversaw Blair's successful 2001 UK general election campaign for re-election and also returned to assist with the successful 2005 UK general election campaign.

Iraq War
In the run-up to the Iraq War, Campbell was involved in the preparation and release of the "September Dossier" in September 2002 and the "Iraq Dossier" (nicknamed "Dodgy Dossier") in February 2003. These documents argued the case for concern over possible weapons of mass destruction (WMDs) in Iraq. Both have been criticised as overstating or distorting the actual intelligence findings. Subsequent investigation revealed that the September Dossier had been altered on Campbell's orders to be consistent with a speech given by George W. Bush and statements by other United States officials. On 9 September 2002, Campbell sent a memo to Sir John Scarlett, the chairman of the Joint Intelligence Committee, in which Campbell directed that the British dossier be "one that complements rather than conflicts with" the US claims.

Later in 2003, commenting on WMDs in Iraq, Campbell said, "Come on, you don't seriously think we won't find anything?". He resigned in August 2003 during the Hutton Inquiry into the death of David Kelly. Kelly's view that the government exaggerated the Iraqi threat in the Iraq Dossier, told to BBC journalists Andrew Gilligan and Susan Watts, had led to Campbell battling with the BBC. When Defence Secretary Geoff Hoon revealed to Campbell that Kelly had talked to the BBC, Campbell had then decided, in his own words, to use this fact to "fuck Gilligan". The counsel for the Kelly family said to Lord Hutton: 'The family invite the inquiry to find that the government made a deliberate decision to use Dr Kelly as a pawn as part of its strategy in its battle with the BBC.' Campbell claimed in June 2013 that Tony Blair had "greater commitment to wartime truth than Winston Churchill". 
Campbell gave evidence to the Iraq Inquiry on 12 January 2010.

Later career

Campbell worked again for the Labour Party as Campaign Director in the run-up to their third consecutive victory at the 2005 general election. Campbell also acted as an adviser to Gordon Brown and Ed Miliband at the 2010 and the 2015 general elections. Sir Clive Woodward recruited Campbell to manage relations with the press for the British & Irish Lions tour to New Zealand in 2005. Campbell wrote a column for The Times during the tour.

Throughout his time in Downing Street, Campbell kept a diary which reportedly totalled some 2 million words. Selected extracts, titled The Blair Years, were published on 9 July 2007. Subsequent press coverage of the book's release included coverage of what Campbell had chosen to leave out, particularly in respect of the relationship between Blair and his chancellor and successor Gordon Brown. Campbell expressed an intention to one day publish the diaries in fuller form, and indicated in the introduction to the book that he did not wish to make matters harder for Brown in his new role as Prime Minister, or to damage the Labour Party.

In 2003 and 2004, he ran a series for The Times newspapers, analysing greatness in sport to answer the question "Who is the greatest sports star of all time?" Although his conclusion was Muhammad Ali, as part of the process, he interviewed and profiled sports stars from around the world, including Ian Botham, Nick Faldo, Ben Ainslie, Michael Phelps, Martina Navratilova, Shane Warne, Alex Ferguson, Bobby Charlton and Lance Armstrong. Campbell later said that he "fell hook, line and sinker" for the Armstrong legend. He subsequently worked with Armstrong, campaigning for cancer charities, but drew criticism from Armstrong's nemesis David Walsh for being so supportive and defending him so passionately. Campbell later said that Walsh had been right.

In 2006 and 2007, Campbell took part in Soccer Aid as part of the Rest of the World team. He appeared with Diego Maradona and Paul Gascoigne to raise money for UNICEF.

In 2007, he appeared on Comic Relief Does the Apprentice as project manager, having several clashes with Piers Morgan including his comment of "again?" when Morgan got fired, which went viral.

Campbell has his own website and blog, as well as several pages on social networking websites. He uses these platforms to discuss British politics and other topics close to his heart. So far, Campbell's commentaries and views have garnered media attention and generated interest among various online communities. In October 2008, he broadcast the personal story of his mental illness in a television documentary partly to reduce the stigma of that illness. He has written a novel on the subject entitled All in the Mind.

Campbell appeared as a mentor in the BBC Two series The Speaker in April 2009, offering his advice on persuasive speaking.

Campbell famously clashed with Adam Boulton on Sky News about the result of the 2010 general election, with the latter being reduced to shouting over both Campbell and the show's presenter.

Campbell made his first appearance on the BBC One political discussion programme Question Time on 27 May 2010. At the opening of the edition, presenter David Dimbleby said that the new Conservative-Liberal Democrat coalition would not allow a frontbench member of the government to appear on the show unless Campbell was dropped. The BBC refused to do this. The government later accused the BBC of behaving improperly for allowing Campbell to appear as a more in-depth version of his diaries was due to be published the following week, and a Downing Street spokesman told The Guardian, "Campbell seemed to be on because he's flogging a book next week, so the BBC haven't behaved entirely properly here." Campbell said that he had waited until Labour were in opposition before appearing on the show and that the date was a coincidence as it was the only time he was free. He suggested the discord was part of a Conservative anti-BBC agenda. The minister who had been scheduled to appear was the then Chief Secretary to the Treasury David Laws, who Campbell produced a picture of during the programme. Three days later, Laws resigned his post following revelations about possible irregularities in his expenses claims in The Telegraph the day before.

Campbell appeared on BBC's Top Gear in July 2010, where he was booed by the audience but set a time of 1:47 around the Top Gear test track in the Star in a Reasonably-Priced Car segment.

He also took part in the 2011 Channel Four television series Jamie's Dream School.
In June 2012, he was guest presenter of Have I Got News for You

In 2011, Campbell contacted the Metropolitan Police with suspicions that his phone was hacked by the News of the World in 2003. He received damages, part of which he used to sponsor the Burnley FC women's team.

Campbell presented and narrated the 20 February 2012 edition of BBC current affairs programme Panorama, which was entitled "Britain's Hidden Alcoholics".

In 2012, Campbell made his first appearance in an acting role with a small part in an episode of the BBC drama Accused.

In May 2012, Campbell took a role at PR agency Portland Communications, at the invitation of Tim Allan, a former adviser to Tony Blair. Along with Tony Blair, Campbell has also provided consultancy services to the government of Kazakhstan on "questions of social economic modernisation."

Return to journalism 
In January 2014, Campbell announced that he was joining British GQ with a brief to conduct interviews with figures from "politics... sport, business, culture, (and) other aspects of life that I find interesting", succeeding Piers Morgan. In his role at GQ Campbell has interviewed a wide range of people, including Jose Mourinho, Raheem Sterling, Trent Alexander-Arnold, Mario Balotelli, Mo Farah and Usain Bolt from the world of sport and Tony Blair, Sadiq Khan, Nicola Sturgeon, George Osborne, John McDonnell, John Bercow, and Chuka Umunna from the world of politics, as well as conducting in-depth interviews with many other figures from public life, including Archbishop Justin Welby, Garry Kasparov and Rachel Riley.  In 2017, he conducted an interview with Prince William. In March 2017, GQ began to film the interviews to use as part of their digital platform, beginning with an interview with Owen Jones, and then Tony Blair. When Jeremy Corbyn was interviewed for the magazine in late 2017, he did so on the condition that Campbell would not be the interviewer.

In May 2016, the International Business Times announced that Campbell had joined it as a columnist.

In March 2017, the newspaper The New European announced that it had appointed Campbell as editor-at-large.

In May 2019, he announced that he and his daughter Grace, a comedian and feminist, had launched a joint podcast, Football, Feminism and Everything In Between: a series of interviews with figures from politics, sport and other walks of life. Their first interview was with Ed Miliband, followed by Rachel Riley, Jamie Carragher, Kelly Holmes and Maro Itoje.

When Government Adviser Dominic Cummings broke government guidelines to visit Durham, England, Campbell urged his social media followers to write to all Tory MPs asking for their view, and published a 50,000 word analysis of what he called 'Organised Hypocrisy' on his website based on the responses he collated.

Campbell was a guest presenter of Good Morning Britain from 10 to 12 May 2021, where he presented with Susanna Reid.

January 2022 began a series of interviews for Men's Health called Talking Heads, with a focus on mindset and well-being. Starting with England rugby player Maro Itoje and former athlete turned sports politician Sebastian Coe.

In March 2022 he launched a new podcast, The Rest is Politics, discussing politics home and abroad with former Tory cabinet minister Rory Stewart. It became an instant hit, rising by week 2 to the top of the Apple UK podcast charts, and leading to calls that he and Stewart form a new centre ground party.

He launched a regular series of 'Instagram live' broadcasts, in which he vented his criticisms of Boris Johnson. He was an outspoken critic of Russia's invasion of Ukraine, and the Tory government's tolerance of oligarchs close to Putin in contrast with their 'cruel and shabby' treatment of Ukrainian refugees, who faced enormous red tape before being considered for exile. He wrote extensively on his meetings with the Russian president alongside Tony Blair.

People's Vote campaign 

Immediately after the UK's referendum on membership of the European Union in June 2016, Campbell stated that he thought it was "the worst decision Britain had made in his lifetime" and would do what he could to change people's minds. In addition to establishing The New European, he was one of the early movers in the People's Vote campaign for a referendum on the outcome of the Brexit negotiations.

In 2018 Campbell became part of the top table team at the People's Vote campaign fighting for a referendum on the Brexit deal. This included overseeing the production of campaign films, including one written by and starring his daughter Grace, called The Brexit Special, for which Campbell persuaded actor Richard Wilson to revive his most famous character, Victor Meldrew.

In 2018 Campbell worked for the People's Vote campaign's planning and organisation of a march on Parliament on 20 October, which drew an estimated 250,000 people onto the streets. The march was described by the media as the second biggest ever, after the protest against the Iraq war in 2003.

He helped organize and spoke at a second march and rally attended by an estimated million people in October 2019, on the day Boris Johnson called a rare Saturday sitting in Parliament to back his Brexit deal.

In July 2017, he was invited to speak at the French National Assembly to the newly elected MPs of President Emmanuel Macron's victorious En Marche party, Campbell having met and advised Macron during the campaign. He urged the French to be patient with the United Kingdom and to give them a chance to change course and reverse Brexit. He said Macron had been bolder than Tony Blair in setting up a new party and leading it to power within little over a year.

Campbell wrote a piece criticising the chairman of Open Britain, Roland Rudd, after Rudd unilaterally decided to sack two key campaign officials on the eve of the 2019 UK general election.

Mental health activism 
Campbell's experience with depression was recalled in a BBC documentary titled Cracking Up. He has since then been a prominent supporter and advocate for the mental health anti-stigma campaign Time to Change. In November 2017, he was made an honorary fellow of the Royal College of Psychiatrists in recognition of his work in breaking down the stigma surrounding mental illness and promoting the importance of psychiatry.

Campbell took part in the Mental Health Foundation's takeover of Channel Four for Mental Health Awareness Week 2017, acting as a celebrity continuity announcer. For the Mental Health Awareness Week two years later he broadcast the documentary Alastair Campbell: Depression and Me, exploring different ways of dealing and coping with depression. It was part of a BBC series drawing attention to different mental health conditions.

In 2019, he was appointed global ambassador to Australians for Mental Health, a new umbrella organisation fighting for better services. He made numerous media appearances and caused controversy by saying on the Australian version of Question Time, that Donald Trump and fellow populists were "sowing the seeds of fascism".

He followed that by writing the book Living Better about his struggle with depression.

Expulsion from Labour Party 
On 28 May 2019, Campbell announced that he had been expelled from the Labour Party after voting for the Liberal Democrats in that month's European elections, and that he would appeal against the decision. He also questioned the speed of his expulsion compared to the treatment of Labour colleagues accused of anti-semitism. In response, shadow minister Dawn Butler stated that it was common knowledge that voting for another party would result in automatic exclusion.

He was a long-standing critic of Labour's Brexit strategy and in the May 2019 European elections, he voted Liberal Democrat as a protest vote. He announced this after the polls had closed in interviews on TV and radio covering the results as they came in. He said he did so, in common with many others, to persuade Labour unequivocally to back a People's Vote.  Two days later, by email, he was expelled from the Party, a move which provoked a major media storm in which many other Labour members outed themselves as having voted for parties other than Labour, including Cherie Blair, Charles Clarke, Bob Ainsworth and Betty Boothroyd. A hashtag #ExpelMeToo trended on Twitter as ordinary members expressed their support for Campbell. He immediately appealed the decision, saying tactical voting was not a breach of the rule under which he had been expelled, and arguing that unless all others who had acted as he did were expelled he also had a case for discrimination. Labour deputy leader Tom Watson condemned the expulsion as "spiteful" and a number of senior MPs immediately called for the decision to be reversed, and an amnesty of all who voted against Labour in the European elections.

In July 2019, in the week Boris Johnson became prime minister, Campbell penned a 3,500-word open letter to Jeremy Corbyn saying he no longer wished to be re-admitted to the party despite legal advice saying he would win a court case against his expulsion. He called on Corbyn to step down and cited his "failure" on Brexit, antisemitism, broader policy and "above all the failure to develop and execute a strategy". The story was broken in The Guardian and the full letter published in The New European. Corbyn said he was "disappointed", prompting Campbell to ask why he had been expelled.

Campbell voted Labour in the 2019 general election, having been part of a failed tactical voting campaign aimed at preventing Johnson from winning a majority.

In March 2022, Campbell launched The Rest is Politics podcast with Rory Stewart, a former Conservative Member of Parliament and candidate in the 2019 Conservative Party leadership election. The pair discuss current news stories and reminisce about their old jobs.

Personal life 
Campbell has described himself as a pro-faith atheist, and his statement "we don't do God" is one of his more repeated soundbites. However, he was asked in late 2017 by the Archbishop of Canterbury Justin Welby, whom Campbell had interviewed for GQ, to contribute to his book on the meaning of Christmas.

In August 2016 Campbell's older brother, Donald, who had schizophrenia, died at the age of 62 due to complications resulting from his illness. Campbell has talked extensively about how Donald, the Principal's official bagpiper at Glasgow University and a competitor in high-level Piobaireachd competitions, had inspired him to fight for better mental health services and understanding, and to become the ambassador for several mental health charities.

When Campbell was a boy, he would cross the county boundary to Lancashire to watch Burnley F.C. with his father. He remains a lifelong Burnley supporter and writes about their exploits in a column titled "Turf Moor Diaries" for the FanHouse UK football blog. He is regularly involved in events with the club. He was heavily involved in rescuing the club from potential bankruptcy, gaining the support of many high-profile public figures. He was one of the founders of the University College of Football Business, based at Burnley's stadium. He is also a fan of the Rugby League club Keighley Cougars, it having been a childhood dream to play for the team.

In his spare time Campbell plays the bagpipes to relieve stress. In December 2017, a musical project he was involved in won the Community Award at the Na Trads traditional Scottish music awards. He had played the bagpipes at a concert in Glasgow earlier in the year, staged entirely by musicians with links to Tiree. The Tiree Community Songbook was made into a CD, which won a Community award at the Traditional Music awards.

He is a keen runner, cyclist, swimmer and triathlete. He raised over half a million pounds for charity running the London Marathon in 2003. In his 60s, he developed an interest in cold water swimming.

During the COVID-19 pandemic, he performed on the bagpipes in a charity song written by Martin Gillespie of Scottish band  Skerryvore, "Everyday Heroes", which topped the iTunes download charts within hours of release. All proceeds from sales went to the National Health Service Charities COVID-19 Urgent Appeal. Earlier, a film of Campbell serenading his next door neighbour, nurse Matilda Bridge as she comes home from work, had millions of views and garnered media coverage around the world. It started a trend of pipers playing around the country during weekly 'clap for the NHS' events.

He entered into a civil partnership with British journalist Fiona Millar, on 30 March 2021, after being together for 42 years. The couple have two sons and a daughter, the comedian Grace Campbell.

Stage and screen portrayals 
A regular feature of comedy programme Bremner, Bird and Fortune was a satirical version of Campbell's discussions with Tony Blair, in which Rory Bremner played Blair and Andrew Dunn played Campbell. In 2005, Campbell was played by Jonathan Cake in the Channel 4 television film The Government Inspector, based on the David Kelly Case. The following year, he was portrayed by Mark Bazeley in the Stephen Frears film The Queen – a role reprised by Bazeley in 2010 follow-up The Special Relationship, also written by Peter Morgan but this time directed by Richard Loncraine. Alex Jennings, who portrayed Prince Charles in The Queen, portrayed Campbell in the television drama A Very Social Secretary. In an episode of Dead Ringers his close relationship with Tony Blair is satirised in an imaginary scenario where Blair is divorcing his wife. He is asked if it will be difficult to sack the person he most loves and cherishes, replying "I'm not sacking Alastair Campbell".

It is also widely believed that the character of Malcolm Tucker from the BBC political satire comedy The Thick of It is loosely based on Campbell. Tucker is famous for his short fuse and use of very strong language. In an interview with Mark Kermode on BBC2's The Culture Show, Campbell denied that the two are similar in any relevant way, but admitted to his liberal use of profanities in the workplace. The interview descended into argument, with Campbell accusing the likes of Mark Kermode and the show's creator Armando Iannucci of being responsible for people's cynicism with modern politics.

Television appearances 
In November 2021 Campbell was featured in the BBC series Winter Walks, walking in the Yorkshire Dales along Ribblesdale, from a waterfall above the market town of Settle, to Catrigg Force near Stainforth,  to the North.

On 7 July 2022 Campbell appeared on BBC One's Question Time.

In May 2022 it was announced that Campbell would appear in the Channel 4 political entertainment series Make Me Prime Minister, due to broadcast at the end of September 2022.

Honours

  He was awarded an Honorary Fellowship of the Royal College of Psychiatrists (FRCPsych) on 6 November 2017.
  He was awarded the Gold Medal of Honorary Patronage by the Philosophical Society of Trinity College Dublin on 16 October 2019.
 He has on a number of occasions turned down the opportunity to sit in the House of Lords. In 2010, Gordon Brown offered him a senior ministerial position alongside a peerage, but Campbell is a long-standing opponent of the House of Lords.

Published books
Campbell has published a number of books, including eight volumes of memoirs. In February 2018, he wrote, with Paul Fletcher, a novel on football and terrorism in the 1970s, Saturday Bloody Saturday. The book has a front cover quote from commentator John Motson describing it as "the best football novel I have ever read".

The Blair Years (2008). Arrow. 
All in the Mind (2008). Hutchinson. 
Maya (2010). Hutchinson. 
Diaries Volume One: Prelude to Power 1994–1997 (2010). Hutchinson. 
Diaries Volume Two: Power and the People 1997–1999 (2011). Hutchinson. 
Diaries Volume Three: Power and Responsibility 1999–2001 (2012). Hutchinson. 
The Burden of Power: Countdown to Iraq (2013). Arrow.  (volume four, 2001–2003)
The Happy Depressive: In Pursuit of Personal and Political Happiness (2012). Arrow. 
My Name Is... (2013). Arrow. 
The Irish Diaries 1994–2003 (2013). The Lilliput Press. 
Winners: And How They Succeed (2015). Pegasus. 
Diaries Volume Five: Outside, Inside 2003–2005 (2016). Biteback. 
Diaries Volume Six: From Blair to Brown 2005–2007 (2017) Biteback. 
Saturday Bloody Saturday (2018) Orion.

References

Further reading
Jones, Nicholas (2000). Sultans of Spin: The Media and the New Labour Government. Orion Books. .
Oborne, Peter and Simon Walters (2004). Alastair Campbell. Aurum. 
Rawnsley, Andrew (2001). Servants of the People: The Inside Story of New Labour. Penguin Books. .
Seldon, Anthony (2005). Blair. The Free Press. .

External links 

 – official site
Alastair Campbell article archive at The Guardian
Alastair Campbell article archive at Journalisted

Alastair Campbell profile at BBC News, 29 August 2003

1957 births
Living people
21st-century British male writers
21st-century British novelists
Alumni of Gonville and Caius College, Cambridge
British atheists
British campaign managers
British diarists
British male non-fiction writers
British male novelists
British newspaper editors
British people of Scottish descent
British public relations people
British republicans
British special advisers
Fellows of the Royal College of Psychiatrists
Labour Party (UK) officials
People educated at City of Leicester Boys' Grammar School
People from Keighley